Howard Green (born 1979) is an American football player.

Howard Green may also refer to:

 Howard Green (physician) (1925–2015), American physician
 Howard Charles Green (1895–1989), Canadian politician
 Howard J. Green (1893–1965), American screenwriter

See also
 Green Howards, a former infantry regiment of the British Army